Wonderputt is a 2011 Flash and iPhone mini-golf game that was developed by Reece Millidge/Damp Gnat. It was built using the source code for Millidge's previous game Adverputt. The creative aesthetics of the game received praise; Tom Curtis of Gamasutra likened the visuals to an M.C. Escher drawing. It was an Independent Games Festival finalist for the Excellence in Visual Art award in 2011. The game was developed over a 6-month period in 2011 and was first released on Kongregate. The game reached the #1 spot for paid apps in the UK Apple store and had sold over 100,000 copies by May 2013.

References

2011 video games
Browser games
Flash games
IOS games
Miniature golf video games
Video games developed in the United Kingdom
Video games inspired by M. C. Escher
GameClub games
Single-player video games